WBTS-CD (channel 15) is a Class A television station licensed to Nashua, New Hampshire, United States, serving as the NBC outlet for the Boston area. It is owned and operated by the network's NBC Owned Television Stations division alongside Merrimack, New Hampshire–licensed Telemundo station WNEU (channel 60); it is also sister to regional cable news channel New England Cable News (NECN) and regional sports network NBC Sports Boston. The four outlets share studios at the NBCU Boston Media Center on B Street in Needham, Massachusetts.

Under a channel sharing arrangement, WBTS-CD shares transmitter facilities with Boston-licensed PBS member station WGBX-TV (channel 44) on Cedar Street, also in Needham, on a tower also used by several other TV and radio stations. Despite WBTS-CD legally holding a low-power Class A license, it transmits using WGBX-TV's full-power spectrum. This ensures complete reception across the Boston television market.

WBTS-CD is carried on channel 10 by most local cable television providers; hence the station's on-air branding (since 2018) as NBC 10 Boston.

History

TV13 Nashua
The station came to the air on July 29, 1988, as W13BG on VHF channel 13 in Nashua. It changed its callsign to WYCN-LP on April 8, 1996. Originally owned by Center Broadcasting Corporation of New Hampshire, the station aired local community programming for the Nashua area, with FamilyNet airing for most of the day. Its analog-era tower was located on the Rivier University campus between two above-ground reservoirs and Brassard Hall, with studios located in Memorial Hall on the same campus.

WYCN-LP was nearly dropped by Harron Cable on its Nashua-area systems in October 1999 to accommodate a must-carry request by WMFP (channel 62), a move that could have led to the closure of channel 13 even though its carriage on MediaOne in Nashua itself was not affected. Its carriage was ultimately continued by Adelphia Communications following its purchase of Harron, though the station was dropped for a time in 2000 after an additional must-carry request, from WYDN (channel 48), while Adelphia rebuilt the systems.

WYCN-LP, along with three co-owned translators in Nashua, Manchester, and Concord, was sold by Center Broadcasting Corporation of New Hampshire to New Hampshire 1 Network, a company controlled by William H. Binnie, in 2010.  The deal was completed January 3, 2012; in the meantime, Binnie would also acquire WBIN-TV (channel 50, now WWJE-DT) in Derry. As a result of the sale, much of WYCN's community programming, including aldermatic debates, was discontinued. In December 2012, the station's studios moved from Rivier University to a location shared with sister station WFNQ (106.3 FM).

New Hampshire 1 Network filed to sell WYCN-LP to OTA Broadcasting, a company controlled by Michael Dell's MSD Capital, on January 14, 2013; the three translators were not included in the deal, and began to simulcast WBIN-TV. Operation of WYCN continued to be handled by New Hampshire 1. At the time of the sale, WYCN was affiliated with My Family TV. The Federal Communications Commission (FCC) approved the sale on March 22, and it was completed on May 20.

WYCN-LP resumed producing local programming soon after the sale to OTA Broadcasting; however, in June 2013, Comcast (successor to both Harron/Adelphia and MediaOne) informed the station that it would be dropped from its lineup as of August 15 due to the earlier cessation of local programming, as well as its limited broadcast reach and continued analog broadcasting, even though WYCN had a construction permit to convert to digital operations and increase its broadcast range. Comcast subsequently pushed back the date of the removal to September 3, despite protests from viewers, politicians, and Nashua's public access station.

Due to its low power, WYCN's analog signal reached only portions of Nashua, its city of license. In contrast, its digital signal was expected to reach Manchester and Boston. The digital facility was planned to sign on by December 2013; construction was held up by the need to use a helicopter to remove a former antenna for WNDS (now WWJE-DT) from the tower on Merril Hill in Hudson that WYCN planned to use, an operation that was delayed to May 2014 by winter weather. The conversion to digital was licensed by the FCC on October 23, 2014; concurrent with the launch of the digital signal, the analog channel 13 signal was shut down.

The station's pre-auction digital signal broadcast on UHF channel 36. Through the use of PSIP, digital television receivers displayed the station's virtual channel as its former VHF analog channel 13.

As WBTS-CD
WYCN-CD sold its frequency rights as part of the FCC's spectrum auction for $80.4 million. OTA Broadcasting entered into a channel sharing agreement with WGBX-TV (channel 44) for the station; NBC agreed to purchase the channel share agreement and the WYCN-CD license in October 2017. In December 2017, the station announced on its website that it would "cease broadcasting on its current frequency on January 16, 2018 and begin broadcasting NBC Boston on a new frequency." As WYCN's signal overlaps with WGME-TV in Portland, Maine, which also uses virtual channel 13, WYCN began using virtual channel 15 following the commencement of channel sharing, as WGME's post-auction physical channel is 15 (WGME's pre-auction channel, 38, was not available to WYCN as virtual channel 38 is assigned to WSBK-TV).

The sale to NBC was completed on January 18, 2018; the station began channel sharing with WGBX the same day. Prior to this transition, WYCN-CD was affiliated with Heroes & Icons (H&I), which also maintained a full-market affiliation on the second subchannel of WSBK-TV; that station continues to carry H&I, though the network lost the low channel number cable carriage it held with WYCN-CD.

On August 8, 2019, WBTS-LD (channel 8) and WYCN-CD swapped call signs, with channel 8 becoming WYCN-LD and channel 15 changing to WBTS-CD. On August 31, 2019, WYCN-LD left the air in advance of its October 2019 transmitter move to Norton, Massachusetts, and city of license change to Providence, Rhode Island; WYCN-LD now serves as a Telemundo station for Providence, leaving WBTS-CD as the sole NBC station for the Boston area.

Programming
Syndicated programs airing on WBTS-CD on weekdays are limited by the station's local and network schedule. It airs The Kelly Clarkson Show, Access Hollywood and Access Daily, which are all distributed by NBCUniversal's syndication division.

News operation
WBTS-CD broadcasts 43 hours, 55 minutes of locally produced newscasts each week (with 7 hours, 5 minutes each weekday, 3½ hours on Saturdays and five hours on Sundays); in addition, the station produces the half-hour lifestyle program The Hub Today, which airs weekday afternoons, and the weekly half-hour public affairs program This is New England, which airs Sunday mornings. It also utilizes a news helicopter (SkyRanger), a storm-chaser satellite truck (Weather Warrior), mobile weather radar vehicles (StormRanger), a consumer affairs unit (NBC 10 Boston Responds) and an investigative reporting unit (The Investigators).

Notable current on-air staff
 JC Monahan – anchor
 Pete Bouchard – meteorologist

Subchannels

The station's digital signal is multiplexed via sharing of WGBX's spectrum:

Coverage in Canada
WBTS-CD is one of several Boston television stations uplinked to provide U.S. network programming to television providers in Canada, particularly in Atlantic Canada. On November 11, 2016, Canadian telecommunications company Bell Canada, which distributes Boston's broadcast network affiliates on its satellite, IPTV, and cable TV services in much of eastern Canada and via satellite uplink to other providers, filed a request with the Canadian Radio-television and Telecommunications Commission (CRTC) to add WBTS' main feed to the CRTC's list of foreign television channels authorized for distribution in Canada, which was additionally supported by Rogers Cable for their systems in Atlantic Canada. The request was approved by the CRTC on December 20, 2016; television providers who carried WHDH, including Bell, Eastlink, TELUS Optik TV, Nor-Del Cablevision, Rogers, and CommStream among others, replaced the station with WBTS on January 1, 2017, coinciding with the launch of "NBC Boston" and the end of WHDH's NBC affiliation. On January 1, 2019, Bell MTS' cable television systems in Altona, Carman, Morden, Morris, and Winkler, Manitoba replaced Detroit's WDIV-TV with WBTS entirely.

See also
 Media in Boston
 Channel 15 virtual TV stations in the United States
 Channel 10 branded TV stations in the United States
 Channel 32 digital TV stations in the United States
 Channel 32 low-power TV stations in the United States

References

External links 

 FAQ on NBC Boston, Government of the Commonwealth of Massachusetts

BTS-CD
BTS-CD
Nashua, New Hampshire
1988 establishments in New Hampshire
Television channels and stations established in 1988
Low-power television stations in the United States
NBC Owned Television Stations
NBC network affiliates
Cozi TV affiliates
Companies based in Norfolk County, Massachusetts